R575 road may refer to:
 R575 road (Ireland)
 R575 road (South Africa)